Paul Ivan Thompson (November 2, 1906 – September 13, 1991) was a Canadian ice hockey winger who played 13 season in the National Hockey League (NHL). He was the younger brother of Hockey Hall of Fame goaltender Cecil "Tiny" Thompson.

Career 
Thompson started his National Hockey League career with the New York Rangers in 1926.  He would also play for the Chicago Black Hawks and retire after the 1939 season. Twice, he was a member of the NHL All-Star team.  He was a three-time winner of the Stanley Cup, winning it in 1928 with the Rangers, and in 1934 and 1938 with Black Hawks.

Thompson faced his brother Tiny in the 1929 Stanley Cup Finals, marking the first time a set of brothers faced each other in a goaltender-forward combination in Stanley Cup Finals history. Paul's Rangers were swept by Tiny's Boston Bruins. Tiny said of the matchup: "When I played goal for Boston against Paul (in) the final of 1929, he was just a rookie. It was really no contest."

After retiring from playing, Thompson became a professional coach, notably coaching the Chicago Black Hawks between 1939 and 1945, and the Vancouver Canucks of the Pacific Coast Hockey League (PCHL), between 1945 and 1947.

Career statistics

Coaching record

References

External links

Paul Thompson's biography at Legends Of Hockey

1906 births
1991 deaths
Canadian ice hockey coaches
Canadian ice hockey left wingers
Chicago Blackhawks coaches
Chicago Blackhawks players
Ice hockey player-coaches
New York Rangers players
Ice hockey people from Calgary
Stanley Cup champions